Evolven is a technology company that provides IT operations analytics (ITOA) for businesses. Founded in 2007, Evolven is headquartered in Jersey City, New Jersey, with offices in Europe and Israel.

History
Evolven applies the principles of IT operations analytics, correlating symptoms and IT context data with changes. Evolven's software performs data cleansing, correlation to prepare high volumes of diverse, cross silo data for analysis.
Evolven was founded in 2007 by Mercury Interactive (acquired by HP in 2007) veteran,  Alexander (Sasha) Gilenson, and is majority owned by Pitango Venture Capital and Index Ventures. On May 13, 2013, Evolven announced integration with ServiceNow products. In September 2014, Evolven received integration certification from ServiceNow. In July 2015, Evolven Software announced a software release.

From 2013 through 2015, the company was mentioned by the trade press.

References

External links
 Software Magazine  Better Performance, Faster Innovation: Analytics enable IT and business  to work better together (June 6, 2015)
 Virtualization Review  Change-Centric, Blended Analytics (April 2, 2015)
 Tech Republic  IT Operations Analytics: The driving factors that are making it 'spread like wildfire' (October 8, 2014)
 CIO Insight  IT Challenged by Lack of Operational Visibility (June 14, 2013)

Information technology companies of the United States
Information technology management
Application software